Nationality words link to articles with information on the nation's poetry or literature (for instance, Irish or France).

Events

February/March - Arthur Rimbaud meets Paul Verlaine for the last time in Stuttgart, Germany, after Verlaine's release from prison, gives him the manuscript of his poems Illuminations and gives up literary writing entirely at the age of 20.
October 1 - American poet and short story writer Edgar Allan Poe is reburied in Westminster Hall and Burying Ground, Baltimore, Maryland, with a larger memorial marker. Some controversy arises years later as to whether the correct body was exhumed.
December 6 - German emigrant ship SS Deutschland runs aground in the English Channel resulting in the death of 157 passengers and crew and inspiring Gerard Manley Hopkins' poem The Wreck of the Deutschland. This introduces his innovative sprung rhythm and metre but, being rejected for publication in 1876, is not published until 1918.

Works published in English

United Kingdom
 George Barlow, Under the Dawn
 Wilfrid Scawen Blunt, published under the pen name "Proteus", Sonnets and Songs (see also Love Sonnets 1881, Love Lyrics 1892)
 Robert Browning, Aristophanes' Apology
 Alice Meynell, Preludes
 Sir Henry Taylor, A Sicilian Summer; St. Clement's Eve; The Eve of the Conquest

United States
 William Cullen Bryant, Poems
 Will Carleton, Farm Legends
 Christopher Pearse Cranch, The Bird and the Bell
 Richard Watson Gilder, The New Day
 Paul Hamilton Hayne, The Mountain of the Lovers
 Oliver Wendell Holmes, Songs of Many Seasons
 Henry Wadsworth Longfellow, The Masque of Pandora and Other Poems
 John Godfrey Saxe, Leisure-Day Rhymes
 Bayard Taylor, Home Pastorals, Ballads, and Lyrics
 John Greenleaf Whittier, Hazel-Blossoms

Works published in other languages
 François Coppée, Olivier
 Holger Drachmann,  Dæmpede Melodier  ("Muffled Melodies"), Denmark
 French translation of Edgar Allan Poe's "The Raven", by Stéphane Mallarmé with drawings by Édouard Manet

Awards and honors

Births
Death years link to the corresponding "[year] in poetry" article:
January 4 – William Williams (Crwys) (died 1968), Welsh poet
March 30 – Edmund Clerihew Bentley (died 1956), popular English novelist and humorist and inventor of the clerihew, an irregular form of humorous pseudo-biographical verse
June 8 (May 27 O.S.) – Ernst Enno (died 1934), Estonian poet
July 19 – Alice Dunbar-Nelson (died 1935) African-American poet, journalist and political activist and part of the Harlem Renaissance; her husband Paul Laurence Dunbar is also a poet
July 26 – Antonio Machado (died 1939), Spanish poet
August – Fannie B. Linderman (died 1960), American poet, writer, educator, entertainer
November 3 – Samukawa Sokotsu 寒川鼠骨(died 1954), Japanese Haiku poet of Meiji period, Masaoka Shiki's pupil
December 4 – Rainer Maria Rilke (died 1926) who has been called one of the greatest 20th-century poets in German
December 8 – Yone Noguchi 野口米次郎 (died 1947), Japanese poet, fiction writer, essayist, and literary critic in both English and Japanese; father of the sculptor Isamu Noguchi
 Also:
 Jean Charbonneau (died 1960) French Canadian poet who is the primary founder of the Montreal Literary School
 Percy MacKaye (died 1956), American dramatist and poet

Deaths
Birth years link to the corresponding "[year] in poetry" article:
January 22 – Charles Sprague, 83, American banker and poet
January 23 – Charles Kingsley, 55, English novelist and poet
June 4 – Eduard Mörike, 70, German Romantic poet
October 24 – Raffaello Carboni (born 1817), Australian
December 3 – Robert Stephen Hawker, 71, English poet, antiquarian of Cornwall, Anglican clergyman and reputed eccentric best known as the author of Cornwall's "national anthem" "The Song of the Western Men"
December 10 – Ōtagaki Rengetsu 太田垣蓮月, member of the Todo family who took "Rengetsu" ("Lotus Moon") as her Buddhist name when she became a nun, and is known as "Rengetsu" (born 1791), Buddhist nun, widely regarded to have been one of the greatest Japanese poets of the 19th century; potter, painter and expert calligrapher

See also

 19th century in poetry
 19th century in literature
 List of years in poetry
 List of years in literature
 Victorian literature
 French literature of the 19th century
 Poetry

Notes

19th-century poetry
Poetry